() is the second-most populated municipality in Troms og Finnmark county, Norway. It is mostly located on the large island of Hinnøya. The municipal center is the town of Harstad, which is the most populous town in Central Hålogaland and the third-largest in all of Northern Norway. The town was incorporated in 1904. Villages in the municipality include Elgsnes, Fauskevåg, Gausvik, Grøtavær, Kasfjord, Lundenes, Nergården and Sørvika.

The  municipality is the 226th largest by area out of Norway's 356 municipalities and 49th most populous with a population of 24,903.

Geography

The municipality is located on many islands in southern Troms og Finnmark county. Most of the municipality is located on the large island of Hinnøya, which is Norway's largest coastal island (three islands in the Svalbard archipelago are larger). The northern part of the municipality is located on the smaller islands of Grytøya, Bjarkøya, Sandsøya, Helløya, Flatøya and Krøttøya and many even smaller islands between the Andfjorden (to the west) and the Vågsfjorden (to the east). The municipality contains several small islands, including Arnøya, Gressholman, Helløya, Kjeøya, Kjøtta, Kjøttakalven, Flatøya, Meløyvær, Måga, Rogla, Lille Rogla and Åkerøya.

Harstad is bordered by the municipality Kvæfjord to the west and Tjeldsund (in Nordland county) to the south. To the southeast, the Tjeldsund Bridge connects Hinnøya with Skånland municipality and the mainland across Tjeldsundet, and to the northeast is the Vågsfjorden, where Harstad shares a water border with Ibestad municipality. The city itself is located on the northeastern part of on Hinnøya; it is the only city on the island, and is popularly known as Vågsfjordens perle (The pearl of Vågsfjorden).

It is located near the village of Sandtorg in southern Harstad.

Climate and light
Harstad features relatively mild, wet winters and cool, dry summers. Harstad does not have the brutal winters most locations north of the Arctic Circle experience, and is sheltered from Atlantic gales by mountains in the west, and has the main part of the Scandinavian Mountains to the east. The city experiences warmer winters than major cities located 25 degrees farther south in latitude such as Beijing, Chicago and Toronto. Summers in Harstad are cool, with average high temperatures seldom breaking the  mark. Since the weather station opened August 2002, July 2014 was the warmest month with mean , average daily high  and all-time high   on 10 July. The coldest month recorded was January 2003 with mean  and average daily low . 
The city enjoys the midnight sun during the summer months, from 22 May to 18 July. There is also a period from early May to early August with twilight for a few hours each night as the sun just dips below the horizon, so there is no darkness. The polar night, when the sun is always below the horizon, lasts from 30 November to 12 January. At this time, there are 3–4 hours of dawn and dusk around noon, sometimes with colourful skies towards the south. From late January, the period of daylight rapidly increases, reaching 12 hours by March and 18 hours in April. Harstad is located in the midst of the aurora borealis ( the northern lights) zone, and the aurora can often be seen on clear nights, but not in summer due to the continuous daylight.

History
The town of Harstad was established as a municipality on 1 January 1904 when it was separated from the municipality of Trondenes because it had just been declared a ladested (small seaport). The initial population of the town of Harstad was 1,246. During the 1960s, there were many municipal mergers across Norway due to the work of the Schei Committee. On 1 January 1964, the town of Harstad (population: 3,808) was merged with neighboring municipalities of Sandtorg (population: 7,512) and Trondenes (population: 6,567) to form a new, larger municipality of Harstad with a population of 17,882. Prior to the merger, the town of Harstad had 3,808 residents. On 1 January 2013, the municipality of Bjarkøy (to the north) was merged with Harstad, forming a new, larger municipality of Harstad. On 1 January 2020, the municipality became part of the new Troms og Finnmark county which replaced the old Troms county.

In recent years, a 3000-year-old bronze axe and a 2600-year-old bronze collar have been found at the Trondenes peninsula, just north of the city center. These, together with the burial cairns built close to the sea, are indications of a well-developed Bronze Age culture in the Harstad area.

There is also substantial archeological evidence of a well-developed Iron Age culture in the area, around 200 AD.

Trondenes is mentioned in the Heimskringla as a power centre in the Viking Age and a place to meet and discuss important issues (Trondarting). In 2020 archeologist concluded that Sandtorg, located along the Tjeldsundet strait, south of Harstad town, was the location of the only known Viking age trading place in Northern Norway. The Tjeldsundet strait was very likely an important ship lane back then as it still is today.

Trondenes Church, the world's northernmost medieval church, which dates back to the 13th–15th century, is situated just outside the town.

Adjacent to the church is the Trondenes Historical Center and nearby is the Adolf Gun, an enormous land-based cannon from World War II, and the last of four cannons originally constructed by the Nazis. Harstad is one of the few towns in this part of Norway which were left largely undamaged by World War II.

Origin of the name
The municipality (and town) is named after the old Harstad farm, since the town is built where the farm once was located. The first element is (probably) the genitive case of the male name .

Coat of arms
The coat of arms was granted on 24 April 1953. The official blazon is "Azure, two bars wavy argent". This means the arms have a blue field (background) and the charge is two wavy bars. The bars have a tincture of argent which means they are commonly colored white, but if it is made out of metal, then silver is used. The blue color in the field symbolizes the importance of sea and the wavy bars were chosen to represent the waves in the sea. Since the town of Harstad is located in the municipality, a mural crown is typically shown above the shield. The arms were designed by Jardar Lunde in cooperation with Hallvard Træteberg.

Government
All municipalities in Norway, including Harstad, are responsible for primary education (through 10th grade), outpatient health services, senior citizen services, unemployment and other social services, zoning, economic development, and municipal roads. The municipality is governed by a municipal council of elected representatives, which in turn elect a mayor. The municipality falls under the Trondenes District Court and the Hålogaland Court of Appeal.

Municipal council
The municipal council  of Harstad is made up of 35 representatives that are elected to four-year terms. The party breakdown of the council is as follows:

Mayors
The mayors of Harstad:

1904–1906: Hans Buck (H)
1914–1916: Karl Eystein Kvam (V)
1929–1932: Israel Wulff (Ap)
1932–1935: Nils J. Hunstad (H)
1935–1938: Hans Stordahl (Ap)
1938–1940: Nils J. Hunstad (H)
1941–1945: Hans Methi (NS)
1945–1945: Odd Gangnæs (NS)
1945–1945: Alf Haaland (V)
1945–1945: Nils J. Hunstad (H)
1946–1947: Sigurd Simensen (NKP)
1948–1952: Sigurd Torgersen (Ap)
1952–1964: Leif Bothner (H)
1964–1968: Bjarne Berg-Sæther (Ap)
1968–1969: Leif Arne Heløe (H)
1970–1977: Arnljot Norwich (H)
1978–1987: Johan Nordvik (H)
1987–1993: Kjell Joachimsen (H)
1993–1995: Britt S. Nordlund (H)
1995–1998: Helge Aune (Ap)
1998–2007: Halvar Hansen (Ap)
2007–2011: Helge Eriksen (H)
2011–2019: Marianne Bremnes (Ap)
2019–present: Kari-Anne Opsal (Ap)

Economy
The oil industry of North Norway is centered in Harstad; including Statoil's main office for a new operational area for Northern Norway, the DNV office for Northern Norway, as well as other regional offices including TotalEnergies, Det Norske Oljeselskap ASA and Aibel. Harstad also has shipyards and other industries that are important for the economy. Harstad and the surrounding area have traditionally been among the most productive agricultural regions in Northern Norway,.

Institutions and culture

The city hosts the annual week-long Festival of North Norway in June. It is also the home of the Arctic Moving Image and Film Festival, held in October each year.

Harstad University College, with approximately 1,100 students, has a thriving foreign exchange program with students from all over the world. The hospital in Harstad is part of the University Hospital of North Norway.

The most successful local football team is Harstad Idrettslag (a.k.a. HIL), and the most successful basketball team is the Harstad Vikings.

Harstad is home port for the Anna Rogde, the world's oldest sailing schooner, also known as the sailing queen of Norway.

Harstad Camping is a campsite located in the municipality.

Churches
The Church of Norway has five parishes within the municipality of Harstad. It is part of the Trondenes prosti (deanery) in the Diocese of Nord-Hålogaland.

Military connections
Harstad traditionally has strong ties with the Norwegian Armed Forces. Kystjegerkommandoen (Coastal Ranger Command) has its home base at Trondenes, Harstad. Marinejegerkommandoen is based in Ramsund in Tjeldsund on the mainland south of Harstad. General Carl Gustav Fleischer led the field operations of the Norwegian Armed Forces in WW2, among them the 7,500 soldiers which from the north pushed the Nazi Germans back to Narvik and participated in retaking Narvik on 28 May 1940. A street in Harstad is named Gen. Fleischers Gate in his honour.

Operation Judgement, Kilbotn took place on 4 May 1945, when the Fleet Air Arm of the Royal Navy attacked a U-boat base at Kilbotn, a village in the Harstad district, sinking two ships and a U-boat.

Harstad is also the hometown of the Norwegian army band "Forsvarets Musikkorps Nord Norge" with professional musicians.

Transportation

The towns airport is Harstad/Narvik Airport, Evenes, located on the mainland,  by road from the town center. The airport offers daily flights to Oslo, Trondheim, Bodø, Tromsø and Andenes.

Every morning a northbound and a southbound Hurtigruten ship stop in Harstad.

High-speed craft regularly go between Harstad and Tromsø, Finnsnes, Senja and other places.

There are several ferries and buses in the district, and in Harstad there are local buses.

The leading helicopter company in Northern Norway, Heli-Team, is located in Harstad.

Local areas

Villages north/west of the city 
Alvestad, Aune, Elgsnes, Ervik, Grøtavær, Hagan, Kasfjord, Kilhus, Kjøtta, Lundenes, Mustaparta, Nergården, Røkenes, Steinnes, Stornes, Storvassbotn, Sørlia, Tennvassåsen, Tømmeråsen, Undlandet, Vika and Årnes.

City neighbourhoods 
Bergseng, Blåbærhaugen, Breivika, City Center, Eineberget, Gangsås, Grønnebakkan, Harstadbotn, Harstadåsen, Heggen, Holtet, Kanebogen, Kilbotn, Medkila, Ruggevika, Sama, Seljestad, Skaret, Stangnes, Trondenes and Åsby.

Villages south of the city 
Brokvik, Fauskevåg, Gausvik, Halsebø, Haukebø, Melvik, Nordvik, Sandtorg and Sørvika.

Notable people

Public Service 

 Andrew V. Stoltenberg (1865 in Aarnes – 1921) a US Navy recipient of the Medal of Honor
 Hans Egede (1686–1758) a Dano-Norwegian Lutheran missionary, the Apostle of Greenland
 Anders Holte (1849 in Oldra – 1937) a Norwegian sea captain and navigator
 Rikard Kaarbø (1850–1901) businessman and politician, established the town of Harstad
 John Bernhard Rekstad (1852 in Trondenes – 1934) a geologist and amateur photographer
 Erland Frisvold (1877–1971) a Norwegian colonel, civil engineer and Mayor of Harstad
 Paal Frisvold (1908–1997) a Norwegian general, head of the Norwegian Army 1961 to 1966
 Sverre Holm (1910–1996) a librarian, novelist, resistance member and sociologist
 Bjarne Berg-Sæther (1919–2009) Mayor of Harstad 1963 to 1967 & county mayor
 Hanna Kvanmo (1926–2005) a controversial Norwegian politician; convicted for treason after WWII and later a member of the Norwegian Nobel Committee
 Ola Heide (born 1931 in Trondenes) a Norwegian botanist.
 Leif Arne Heløe (born 1932) a Norwegian politician & former Minister of Social Affairs
 Pål Spilling (1934–2018) a Norwegian Internet pioneer and academic
 Ola M. Steinholt (1934—2009) a Norwegian bishop of the Diocese of Nord-Hålogaland
 Unni Wikan (born 1944), professor of social anthropology
 Gerd Kristiansen (born 1955) a licensed practical nurse and leader of the Norwegian Confederation of Trade Unions from 2013 to 2017
 Kristin Clemet (born 1957) a Norwegian politician & former Minister of Education
 Elisabeth Aspaker (born 1962) a Norwegian politician & former Minister of Fisheries
 Jon Lech Johansen (born 1983) also known as DVD Jon, a Norwegian computer programmer
 Silje Lundberg (born 1988) a Norwegian environmentalist, grew up in Harstad

The Arts 
 Ragnhild Kaarbø (1889–1949) a Norwegian painter
 Knut Andersen (1931-2019) film director 
 Reidar Thomassen (born 1936) a Norwegian writer and javelin thrower
 Jan Høiland (1939–2017) a Norwegian pop singer, who lived for many years in Harstad
 Odd Børre (born 1939) a former pop singer, sang at the 1968 Eurovision Song Contest
 Leif Erik Forberg (born 1950) a Norwegian television and radio presenter
 Kine Hellebust (born 1954) a singer, actress, children's writer and playwright 
 Ketil Stokkan (born 1956) a pop singer, sang at the 1986 Eurovision Song Contest
 Iren Reppen (born 1965) a Norwegian actress 
 Bodil Arnesen (born 1967) a Norwegian operatic soprano
 Kari Innerå (born 1982) a Norwegian gourmet chef
 Iselin Steiro (born 1985) a Norwegian model
 Sophie Elise, (Norwegian Wiki) (born 1994), blogger and singer 
 Ruben Markussen (born 1995) a Norwegian singer / songwriter; grew up in Bjarkøy
 Thea Floer Kulseng, (Norwegian Wiki) (born 2003), winner of Melodi Grand Prix Junior 2015

Sport 
 Trygve Bornø (born 1942) a retired footballer with 419 club caps and 43 for Norway
 Knut Frostad (born 1967) a yachtsman, competed in the 1988 & 1992 Summer Olympics
 Marianne Paulsen (born 1980) a Norwegian football defender
 Tom Høgli (born 1984) a former football defender with 300 club caps and 49 for Norway
 Eirik Lamøy (born 1984) a Norwegian football striker with 300 club caps

International relations

Twin towns – Sister cities
The twin towns of Harstad are:
  Elsinore in Denmark
  Kirovsk, Murmansk Oblast in Russia
  Umeå in Sweden
  Vaasa in Finland

See also
 List of schools in Harstad

References

External links

 
 Information in English  Harstad municipality
 Visit Harstad
 Culture
 Old history of Harstad
 Harstad pictures
 Green and black aurora over Harstad NASA astronomy picture of the day
 Particularly rare purple auroral corona over Harstad NASA astronomy picture of the day
 Web-cam Showing various parts of the town
 Photo presentation on YouTube
 The Adolf Cannon
 Art of the States: Frozen Horizon Musical work inspired by the Harstad landscape
 Harstad Tidende (Harstad Times) Newspaper for the district 
 iHarstad.no Information portal 
 Live weather station located in Harstad 
 About Hinnøy 
 Magnars garden at 69 degrees north 

 
Populated coastal places in Norway
Municipalities of Troms og Finnmark
Populated places in Troms og Finnmark
Populated places of Arctic Norway
1904 establishments in Norway